Johan Johanessen Bakke (born 1 April 2004) is a Norwegian professional footballer who plays as a midfielder for Molde. He is the son of former footballer Eirik Bakke.

Club career
Bakke came through the youth academy of Sogndal, where his father and grandfather also played. On 8 September 2020, he made his league debut for Sogndal against Strømmen.

On 24 January 2022, Bakke signed for Molde on a three-year contract from Sogndal. he was an unused substitute as Molde won the 2022 Norwegian Cup final; his first honour. On 25 January 2023, Molde extended their contract with Bakke until the end of 2026.

Career statistics

References

External links

2004 births
Living people
Norwegian footballers
Norway youth international footballers
Association football midfielders
Sogndal Fotball players
Molde FK players
Norwegian First Division players
Eliteserien players